Torshi are the pickled vegetables of many Middle Eastern, Iran and Balkan cuisines.

Torshi is common in Arab, Turkish, Kurdish, Afghan, Bosnian, Armenian and Iranian cuisine. Iran has hundreds of types of torshi, according to regional customs and different events. In some families, no meal is considered complete without a bowl of torshi on the table. Toursi is a traditional appetizer (meze) to go with arak, rakı, ouzo, oghi, tsipouro, and rakia. In some regions, notably in Turkey (turşu suyu), the pickle juice or torshi water is a popular beverage.

In Macedonian cuisine, it is a popular appetizer, traditionally prepared in the fall, and enjoyed throughout winter as a side dish to hearty stews. In Bulgarian cuisine, the most popular types are tsarska turshiya ("king's pickle") and selska turshiya ("country pickle"). 

Torshi is often made in homes in the autumn, even in cities. It is also sold by specialists and in supermarkets, and is served in restaurants.

In 2021, Turkey's pickle exports reached the level of $300 million.

Name
The word torshi is ultimately derived from Persian  'sour'. The word is found with minor variants in many languages: ; Kurdish  Tirşîn, tirşî, trshin; Turkish and Azerbaijani ; ; Bosnian, Croatian, Montenegrin, Serbian, Macedonian, Bulgarian turšija/туршија/туршия turshiya; .

Other languages translate it as 'pickle': Aramaic ܡܟ̇ܠܠ; ; ; .

Recipes
Torshi is made with garlic, chili peppers, celery, cauliflower, carrots, beets, shallots, cabbage, aubergines (eggplant) and other vegetables, and dried aromatic herbs pickled in vinegar or brandy, salt, and different spice mixtures, which usually include whole black peppercorns, ginger, etc. Persian-style torshi includes more vinegar, while Turkish style turşu includes more salt as an antibacterial agent.

Torshi liteh is made with eggplants and herbs (parsley, coriander, mint, tarragon, basil). Eggplants are baked in the oven, put in a glass jar with herbs and vinegar, and stored in a cool, dry place for two to three months.

Tsarska turshiya is made with cauliflower, red peppers, carrots, and celery. The vegetables are mixed with some salt and sugar and left overnight. The next day the juice is mixed with vinegar and boiled for several minutes. The vegetables are put in glass jars and pressed down with cherry twigs and a round river stone, then the jars are filled with the cooled pickle marinade.

Selska turshiya is made with green peppers, green tomatoes, carrots, cauliflower, cabbage, and celery. The vegetables are put in a container, pressed down with some twigs and a stone, and a marinade made of salt, vinegar and water is poured on. The pickles are left to ferment.

See also

References

Pickles
Appetizers
Iranian cuisine
Arab cuisine
Ashkenazi Jewish cuisine
Balkan cuisine
Sephardi Jewish cuisine
Middle Eastern cuisine
Mizrahi Jewish cuisine
Afghan cuisine
Kurdish cuisine
Assyrian cuisine
Azerbaijani cuisine
Armenian cuisine
Israeli cuisine
Ottoman cuisine
Fermented foods